Michael Bishai (born May 30, 1979) is a Canadian former professional ice hockey centre. Bishai was never drafted, but played in the National Hockey League with the Edmonton Oilers.

Playing career

Amateur 
Born in Edmonton, Alberta, Bishai moved to British Columbia to play junior hockey. Bishai played two seasons with the South Surrey Eagles in the BCHL, before moving on to Western Michigan University, where he played four seasons.  In 2001, Bishai led the Central Collegiate Hockey Association in points, and led the NCAA in points per game.  At the tale end of the 2001–02 season, Bishai signed with Edmonton and was assigned to their AHL affiliate, the Toronto Roadrunners.

Professional
Bishai played most of his Oiler career with affiliates in the AHL, but in the 2003–04 season, he made his NHL debut and played 14 games with the Oilers. Bishai signed with the Phoenix Coyotes organization prior to the 2005–06 season and was assigned to its AHL affiliate, the San Antonio Rampage.

Bishai then joined Moscow Dynamo for the 2006–07 season. After playing in only 23 games with Moscow, Bishai left for the Finnish SM-l where he signed with Ilves Tampere for the 2007–08 season. After a successful season with Ilves, Mike then signed with rival team Jokerit for the 2008–09 season.

Bishai is most remembered for a fight with Atlanta Thrashers player Serge Aubin on February 11, 2004. The fight, during a line brawl, was notable because Aubin tossed Bishai into the Atlanta bench. Bishai got to his feet and continued to trade punches with Aubin, while stunned Thrashers looked on unsure what to do.

Oilers coach Craig MacTavish commented on the fight and said, "...As many years as I've been in the game, I've never seen a guy fighting standing up in the opposition's bench...That's like diving into somebody else's foxhole."

Career statistics

Awards and honours

References

External links 

1979 births
Living people
Canadian ice hockey centres
Columbus Cottonmouths (ECHL) players
Edmonton Oilers players
Hamilton Bulldogs (AHL) players
HC Dynamo Moscow players
Ice hockey people from Edmonton
Ilves players
Jokerit players
Lausanne HC players
San Antonio Rampage players
SC Bietigheim-Bissingen players
Toronto Roadrunners players
Undrafted National Hockey League players
Western Michigan Broncos men's ice hockey players
Canadian expatriate ice hockey players in Finland
Canadian expatriate ice hockey players in Germany
Canadian expatriate ice hockey players in Russia
Canadian expatriate ice hockey players in Switzerland
AHCA Division I men's ice hockey All-Americans